Anabas cobojius, the Gangetic koi, popularly known as Koi in Bengali is a species of climbing gourami native to Bangladesh and India, where it occurs in many types of standing water bodies. It is of commercial importance as a food fish in its native range. In addition to being fished, it may be threatened by siltation from deforestation and agricultural activities, pollution and habitat change by hydropower and dam development. The exact population is unknown. It spawns once during the rainy season from May–July.

Popular culture 
A Bengali idiom says ''Koi machher pran" or ''Life of Koi fish" as this fish can survive a long time outside of water.

References

cobojius
Freshwater fish of India
Fish of Bangladesh
Fish described in 1822
Taxa named by Francis Buchanan-Hamilton